Hypnum cupressiforme, the cypress-leaved plaitmoss or hypnum moss, is a common and widespread species of moss belonging to the genus Hypnum. It is found in all continents except Antarctica and occurs in a wide variety of habitats and climatic zones. It typically grows on tree trunks, logs, walls, rocks and other surfaces. It prefers acidic environments and is fairly tolerant of pollution. It was formerly used as a filling for pillows and mattresses; the association with sleep is the origin of the genus name Hypnum (from Greek Hypnos).

It is a small to medium-sized moss about 2–10 cm long. It is pleurocarpous, having prostrate, creeping stems which form smooth, dense mats. The stems are branched and covered in overlapping leaves giving the impression of a cypress tree. The stem leaves are long and thin measuring 1.0-2.1 mm by 0.3-0.6 mm. They are concave and sickle-shaped, tapering towards the tip. The branch leaves are smaller and narrower than those on the stems.  The moss produces short, cylindrical and slightly curved capsules which contain the spores. The capsules are 1.7-2.4 mm long and have a lid-like operculum measuring 0.6-0.9 mm. They are borne on reddish-brown stalks which are 1-2.5 cm long. The moss is dioicous, having separate male and female plants. Hypnum cupressiforme is a highly variable species and numerous varieties have been described.

References

Bryophyte Flora of North America. Hypnum cupressiforme. Accessed 22 July 2008.
Glime, Janice M. (2007) "Household and personal uses", Bryophyte Ecology. Accessed 22 July 2008.
Phillips, Roger (1994) Grasses, Ferns, Mosses & Lichens of Great Britain and Ireland, Macmillan, London.
Smith, A. J. E. (2004) The moss flora of Britain and Ireland'', 2nd ed., Cambridge University Press, Cambridge.

Hypnaceae
Plants described in 1801
Taxa named by Johann Hedwig